Moncton, New Brunswick is made up of 19 localities (Neighbourhoods).

Neighbourhoods

Bordering communities

References

Information on Moncton (Residents, Visitors, Businesses, Government)

Greater Moncton Online Main Page

Moncton
 
Lists of populated places in New Brunswick